The Great Summit: The Master Takes is a 2001 Blue Note album by Duke Ellington and Louis Armstrong.
It is a reissue of the two Roulette albums Together For The First Time (track 1–10) and The Great Reunion (track 11–17) from 1961. (These two albums have later resurfaced as a Roulette double-LP entitled The Duke Ellington/Louis Armstrong Years and in 1990 as a remastered CD called Together for the First Time/The Great Reunion.)

The contents of this album is an all-Ellington program performed by himself and Louis Armstrong & His All-Stars. These 17 selections are the entire result of the only studio meeting by Duke Ellington and Louis Armstrong. They both lead a small band - Louis Armstrong's All Stars - and play classic compositions by Ellington such as "Mood Indigo" and "Black And Tan Fantasy".

The Great Summit: The Master Takes
All songs composed by Duke Ellington solely (except where otherwise stated).
Duke's Place — 5:03  Lyrics by William Katz, Bob Thiele and Ruth Roberts.
I'm Just a Lucky So and So — 3:09  Lyrics by Mack David.
Cottontail — 3:42
Mood Indigo — 3:57  Co-composer is Barney Bigard with lyrics by Irving Mills.
Do Nothin' till You Hear From Me — 2:38  Lyrics by Bob Russell.
The Beautiful American  — 3:08
Black and Tan Fantasy — 3:59  Co-composer is James "Bubber" Miley.
Drop Me Off in Harlem — 3:49  Lyrics by Nick Kenny.
The Mooche — 3:38  Lyrics by Irving Mills.
In a Mellow Tone — 3:48  Lyrics by Milt Gabler.
It Don't Mean a Thing (If It Ain't Got That Swing) — 3:58  Lyrics by Irving Mills.
Solitude — 4:55  Lyrics by Eddie DeLange and Irving Mills.
Don't Get Around Much Anymore — 3:31  Lyrics by Bob Russell.
I'm Beginning to See the Light — 3:37  Co-composers are Don George, Johnny Hodges and Harry James.
Just Squeeze Me — 3:58  Lyrics by Lee Gaines.
I Got It Bad (And That Ain't Good) — 5:31  Co-composer is Paul Francis Webster.
Azalea — 5:02

The Making of the Great Summit
Already on August 1, 2000 Blue Note had released the compilation The Great Summit: The Complete Sessions, which contained the reissue above plus a second CD with alternate takes (rehearsals, false starts etc.). The alternate takes were digitally remastered in 2000.
In a Mellow Tone — 4:15
I'm Beginning to See the Light — 6:56
Do Nothin' till You Hear From Me — 5:42
Don't Get Around Much Anymore — 10:43
Duke's Place — 4:18
Drop Me Off in Harlem — 4:57
I'm Just a Lucky So and So — 4:37
Azalea — 8:05
Black and Tan Fantasy — 7:13
Band Discussion on Cottontail — 1:08

Personnel
Duke Ellington (piano)
Louis Armstrong (trumpet, vocals)
Barney Bigard (clarinet)
Danny Barcelona (drums)
Mort Herbert (bass)
Trummy Young (trombone)

Credits
Bob Thiele (producer)
Ray Hall (recording engineer)
Arnold Meyers (cover photograph))
Michael Cuscuna (reissue producer)
Ron McMaster (remix and remaster)

References

1961 albums
Duke Ellington albums
Louis Armstrong albums
Blue Note Records albums
Albums produced by Bob Thiele
Albums produced by Michael Cuscuna